Fitchia is a genus of flowering plants in the sunflower family, native to certain islands in the Pacific.

 Species

References

External links

 
Asteraceae genera
Flora of the Pacific
Taxonomy articles created by Polbot
Taxa named by Joseph Dalton Hooker